Kisei is a Go competition used by the Japanese Nihon-Kiin. The 2001 Kisei was the first edition that used the group system. Preliminary tournaments were held to find the twelve players to split into two groups. The players with the most wins advance to the challenger final. If there are two players tied with the same number of wins, they go through a playoff, usually consisting of one game. If there were three, the player holding the highest ranked title would have a bye, and the other two would have a playoff. Whichever of the two wins, would face the player with the bye. Whoever wins that match, advances to the challenger final.

Group A

Group B

Final 

Kisei (Go)
2001 in go